KMJJ-FM (99.7 MHz) is a radio station with an urban contemporary format broadcasting in Shreveport, Louisiana and the "Ark-La-Tex."  The station is owned by Cumulus Media and is headquartered at the Louisiana Boardwalk shopping center in Bossier City, Louisiana.  The station's transmitter is southwest of the I-20/I-49 interchange in Shreveport, on a landmark non-supported structure nicknamed Eiffel Tower. It is co-located with KVMA-FM and KQHN-FM with the KRMD-FM auxiliary transmitter.

KMJJ was originally known as Majic FM 100 then on 100.1 FM debuting an urban format on August 1, 1988, flipping from easy listening KCOZ.  It has been a heritage urban-formatted station since in the Shreveport area.  In April 1993 KMJJ moved to 99.7 FM and upgraded to 50,000 watts.  In the years since it has gained competition from KDKS and KBTT; it gained format companionship in 2004 when KVMA-FM took to the air.  Since January 2008, KMJJ is the syndicated home of Big Boy's Neighborhood, replacing the Doug Banks Morning Show.

External links
Official website

Radio stations in Louisiana
Urban contemporary radio stations in the United States
Cumulus Media radio stations